
Gmina Trzebnica is an urban-rural gmina (administrative district) in Trzebnica County, Lower Silesian Voivodeship, in south-western Poland. It is part of the Wrocław metropolitan area.

Neighbouring gminas
Gmina Trzebnica is bordered by the gminas of Długołęka, Milicz, Oborniki Śląskie, Prusice, Wisznia Mała, Zawonia and Żmigród.

Villages
Apart from the town of Trzebnica, the gmina contains the villages of Będkowo, Biedaszków Mały, Biedaszków Wielki, Blizocin, Boleścin, Brochocin, Brzezie, Brzyków, Bukowiec, Cerekwica, Domanowice, Droszów, Głuchów Górny, Janiszów, Jaszyce, Jaźwiny, Kanice, Kobylice, Koczurki, Komorówko, Komorowo, Koniówko, Koniowo, Księginice, Kuźniczysko, Ligota, Malczów, Małuszyn, Marcinowo, Masłów, Masłowiec, Nowy Dwór, Piersno, Raszów, Rzepotowice, Skarszyn, Skoroszów, Sulisławice, Świątniki, Szczytkowice, Taczów Mały, Taczów Wielki, Trzy Chałupy, Ujeździec Mały, Ujeździec Wielki and Węgrzynów.

Twin towns – sister cities

Gmina Trzebnica is twinned with:
 Kitzingen, Germany
 Vynnyky, Ukraine

References

Trzebnica
Trzebnica County